Rafi Cricket Stadium is a cricket stadium located in Bahria Town Karachi, Pakistan. It is the largest cricket stadium in Pakistan. Designed by Gerkan, Marg and Partners, it has an ICC-certified design. The complex is consist of a cricket academy of international standard, gymnasium, swimming pool and hostels. The complex also include a sports academy.

Groundbreaking ceremony

Bahria Town Karachi held the groundbreaking ceremony of Pakistan's biggest cricket stadium in Sports City Karachi on Friday, 14 April 2017. The ceremony was attended by the top management of Bahria Town and Pakistani cricketers like Javed Miandad, Zaheer Abbas, Shoaib Mohammad, Shahid Afridi, Umar Akmal, and Fawad Alam. Residents of Bahria Town Karachi as well as people from across the city attended this glorious ceremony.

The chief guest of the event was the Chairman of Bahria Town, Malik Riaz Hussain, who performed the groundbreaking ceremony by pressing the button to start the crane on the project site. He said at the event that Rafi Cricket Stadium would be built in about one and a half years, and by next two years, there will be international cricket matches in this ground. Given the level of security in Bahria Town, and ongoing construction of Hyatt Regency Hotel near Theme Park in Precinct 5, Rafi Cricket Stadium will be an optimal place for hosting international cricket events.

Architect 
Designed by world renowned GMP Germany, the creators of Dubai International Cricket Stadium, Rafi Cricket Stadium's structure has been designed by Boston-based Simpson SGH whereas the façade has been created by SBP Consultants Germany and M&B (Mushtaq & Bilal) Pakistan, MEP is designed by SMC (S. Mehboob & Company) Pakistan, and Pre-Cast Support Consultants are JPC, USA.

References

Test cricket grounds in Pakistan
Cricket
Stadiums in Pakistan
Pakistan
Stadiums in Karachi
Cricket grounds in Pakistan
2016 establishments in Pakistan
Cricket in Karachi
Stadiums under construction